Márta Vass (Hungarian pronunciation: [ˈma:rtə ˈvɑːʃ], born July 6, 1962 in Marcali and raised in Nemesdéd, Hungary) is a Hungarian ultramarathon runner, former IAU100km European champion and multiple IAU 100 km World Championship medallist.

Athletic career 
Vass is Hungary's first internationally recognized female ultra-runner. During her career she set several national records in the 100 km event.
Her outstanding accomplishments include the European 100 kilometer Championship title in 1993. At the same championship she led the Hungarian women’s team (including Ágnes Bozán and Tímea Bontovics) to the second place of the podium.
Her top rivals included Great Britain's Hilary Walker and Eleanor Adams-Robinson.

Vass also has four IAU 100 km World Championship medals under her belt: two silver ( Santander 1988, Palamos 1992) and two bronze (Duluth 1990, Faenza 1991) ones.

She took third place with a strong performance of 6 hours 51 minutes and 4 seconds behind world champions Valentina Lyakhova (Валентина Васильевна Ляхова ) and Valentina Shatyaeva (Шатяева, Валентина Николаевна) in the grueling up-run of the Comrades Marathon in 1994.

Vass was the five-time female winner of the renowned Night of Flanders 100 km race De Nacht van Vlaanderen organized in Torhout, Belgium during midsummer.

Due to her four consecutive victories between 1990 and 1993, Vass became an iconic figure of the prestigious Vienna–Bratislava–Budapest Supermarathon, a five-day stage race covering over 350 km.

Being one of the handful Hungarian ultra-runners to have finished on the podium at IAU championships, Vass was inducted in the Hungarian Ultrarunners' Hall of Fame in January 2016.

Professional life 
Vass is a teacher of mathematics and chemistry, living with her husband György Pék (former handball player and referee) and daughter Eszter in Budapest.

Awards 
 Life Achievement Award for Ultrarunning 2010
 Hungarian Ultrarunners' Hall of Fame 2016

References 

Living people
1962 births
Hungarian female long-distance runners
Athletes from Budapest
Hungarian schoolteachers